This article contains lists of achievements in major senior-level international luge tournaments according to first-place, second-place and third-place results obtained by teams representing different nations. The objective is not to create combined medal tables; the focus is on listing the best positions achieved by teams in major international tournaments, ranking the nations according to the most number of podiums accomplished by teams of these nations.

Results 
For the making of these lists, results from following major international tournaments were consulted:

 FIL: International Luge Federation
 IOC: International Olympic Committee

Medals earned by athletes from defunct National Olympic Committees (NOCs) or historical teams are NOT merged with the results achieved by their immediate successor states. The International Olympic Committee (IOC) do NOT combine medals of these nations or teams.

The conventions used on this table are M for men's singles event, MSp for men's sprint event, W for women's singles event, WSp for women's sprint event, D for doubles event, DSp for doubles' sprint event, T for mixed team event.

The tables are pre-sorted by total number of first-place results, second-place results and third-place results, respectively. When equal ranks are given, nations are listed in alphabetical order.

Artificial and natural track events

All competitive disciplines 

*Defunct National Olympic Committees (NOCs) or historical teams are shown in italic.

Artificial track events

All competitive disciplines 

*Defunct National Olympic Committees (NOCs) or historical teams are shown in italic.

Men 

*Defunct National Olympic Committees (NOCs) or historical teams are shown in italic.

Women 

*Defunct National Olympic Committees (NOCs) or historical teams are shown in italic.

Doubles 

*Defunct National Olympic Committees (NOCs) or historical teams are shown in italic.

Mixed team 

*Defunct National Olympic Committees (NOCs) or historical teams are shown in italic.

Natural track events

All competitive disciplines 

*Defunct National Olympic Committees (NOCs) or historical teams are shown in italic.

See also 
 List of major achievements in sports by nation

Notes

References

General 
 Official results: Statistics of the International Luge Federation FIL

Specific

External links 
 International Luge Federation (FIL) – official website

Luge
Achievements